Austria competed at the 2015 European Games, in Baku, Azerbaijan from 12 to 28 June 2015.

Medalists

Team

Archery

Athletics

Austria won the athletics mixed team event by winning 460 points.

Men's

Women's

Badminton

Beach volleyball

Boxing

Canoe sprint

Men

Women

Cycling

Road cycling

BMX

Diving

Men

Women

Fencing

Gymnastics

Artistic
Team

Individual events

Rhythmic
Austria has qualified two athletes after their performance at the 2013 Rhythmic Gymnastics European Championships.
 Individual – 2 quota places

Judo

Men

Women

Karate

Sambo

Shooting

Men

Women

Mixed

Swimming

Men

Women

Mixed

Synchronised swimming

Table tennis

Triathlon

Women's – Theresa Moser

Wrestling

Men's freestyle

Men's Greco-Roman

Women's freestyle

References

Nations at the 2015 European Games
European Games
2015